Scaling function may refer to:
 Critical exponent#Scaling functions
 Wavelet#Scaling function
 Continuous wavelet transform#Scaling function